Barali is a village and Purohit Residents located between [|Nandpryag]] and Ghat |Vikash Nagar Ghat]], Chamoli, Uttarakhand.

History
Barali is a village and Purohit residents in District Chamoli Uttarakhand.

Poverty
Barali

There is a gap between rich and poor in this village.  Families with relatives abroad obtain more money and have bigger houses.  The majority of people earn a living as farmers.  Although most people in Barali are poor, some do own their own land.  The rich families in this area mostly belong to the Purohit and Pandit.  Many of them have relatives abroad, mostly in England, Italy and Japan.

Roads
In recent years there has been a new road built that connects Khunana and Ghat through Barali.

References

External links
Barali mangral.com

Union councils of Kotli District